Liberalism (original German title: Liberalismus) is a book by Austrian School economist and libertarian thinker Ludwig von Mises, containing economic analysis and indicting critique of socialism. It was first published in 1927 by Gustav Fischer Verlag in Jena and defending classical liberal ideology based on individual property rights. Starting from the principle of private property, Mises shows how the other classical liberal freedoms follow from property rights and argues that liberalism free of government intervention is required to promote peace, social harmony and the general welfare. The book was translated into English by a student of Mises, Ralph Raico, but its first English edition in 1962 was titled The Free and Prosperous Commonwealth rather than Liberalism, as Mises thought that the literal translation would create confusion because the term liberalism after the New Deal and especially in the 1960s became widely used in the United States to refer to a centre-left politics that supports degrees of government intervention, in opposition to Mises' central premise. The English translation was made available online by the Ludwig von Mises Institute in 2000.

Publication history

In German
Ludwig von Mises, Liberalismus. Jena: Gustav Fischer Verlag, 1927.
Ludwig von Mises, Liberalismus. Sankt Augustin: Academia Verlag, 1993. .

In English
The book was translated into English by Ralph Raico.
Ludwig von Mises, The Free and Prosperous Commonwealth: An Exposition of the Ideas of Classical Liberalism. Princeton, Van Nostrand, 1962
Ludwig von Mises, Liberalism, a Socio-Economic Exposition (Studies in economic theory). Mission, KS: Sheed Andrews and McMeel, 1978. .
Ludwig von Mises, Liberalism: In The Classical Tradition. Irvington-on-Hudson, NY: Foundation for Economic Education – San Francisco: Cobden Press, 1985. .
Ludwig von Mises, Liberalism: The Classical Tradition. Irvington-on-Hudson, NY: Foundation for Economic Education, 1996. .
Ludwig von Mises, Liberalism: The Classical Tradition. Indianapolis: Liberty Fund, 2005. .

Reviews

External links
 Full text versions of Liberalism, 1985 edition:
 Full text in HTML
 Full text in PDF
 Full text in EPUB)

Sociology books
1927 non-fiction books
Books about liberalism
Books about capitalism
German books
Libertarianism in Germany
Books by Ludwig von Mises